Peter David Broughton , generally known as Rawiri Paratene, is a New Zealand stage and screen actor, director and writer. He is known for his acting roles in Whale Rider (2002) and The Insatiable Moon (2010).

Biography
Paratene was born at Motukaraka, near Kohukohu, Hokianga, New Zealand, and is of Ngāpuhi descent. He grew up in the south Auckland suburb of Otara, and attended Hillary College as David Broughton, the English form of his name. Paratene's parents were Boyd Alex Broughton and Patricia Charlotte Hancy.

Paratene initially struggled with reading and writing at school, but went on to be the first Māori graduate of the New Zealand Drama School. He graduated in 2005 with a Bachelor of Performing Arts (Acting).

As a young student in the 1970s, Paratene was a member of Ngā Tamatoa, an activist organisation which fought for Māori rights, land, language and culture. Paratene was president of the Wellington chapter, and was one of those who presented the 1972 Te reo Māori petition to parliament. Today, working in the arts, Paratene aspires to have more Māori stories on film.

Career

Theatre
Paratene was selected as a Shakespeare's Globe International Actor's Fellow in 2007. Paratene is an actor, director and writer and appeared as Friar Lawrence in the 2009 London Globe Theatre production of Romeo and Juliet.

The New Zealand Festival commissioned Paratene and Murray Lynch to write a play called Blue Smoke that premiered in 2000. It is set in the 1950s and is a musical featuring music from the era. The title of the play is also the title of a famous song Blue Smoke, which was the first record wholly produced in New Zealand and became a hit in the United States.

In 2014, Paratene joined the cast of the London Globe Theatre's two-year world tour of Hamlet, visiting 205 countries.  He was the only non-British based actor in the cast.

Paratene's swan song production is Peter Paka Paratene directed by Tainui Tukiwaho, presented in 2021 at Te Pou Theatre in Auckland and the Kia Mau Festival.

Film
 Footrot Flats: The Dog's Tale (1986) – Rangi
 Rapa-Nui (1994) – Priest
 What Becomes of the Broken Hearted? (1999) – Mulla Rota
 Whale Rider (2002) – Koro
 The Legend of Johnny Lingo (2003) – Malio Chief
 Man-Thing (2005) – Peter Horn
 The Insatiable Moon (2010) – Arthur

Television
 Play School
 Joe and Koro
 Xena: Warrior Princess – Tazere (Season 6, Episode 5: Legacy)
 Shortland Street – Joe Hudson
 [[Golden Boy (New Zealand TV series)|Golden Boy]]'' - Bertie (Seasons 1 & 2)

Personal life and politics

He is the father of Marama Davidson, who became the Green Party co-leader on 8 April 2018.  She became an MP in 2015 when Russel Norman resigned. She had previously stood for the Green Party in the 2013 Ikaroa-Rāwhiti by-election and the 2014 general election.

Honours and awards

 2021 – Companion of the New Zealand Order of Merit, for services to Māori, film and theatre, in the 2022 New Year Honours
 2012 – Officer of the New Zealand Order of Merit in the 2013 New Year Honours for services to film, television and theatre 
 2011 – Aotearoa Film & Television Award for Best Actor in a Feature Film – The Insatiable Moon (Arthur)
 1996 – NZ Film & Television Award for Best Actor – Dead Cert (Hare)
 1983 – Winner of the Robert Burns Fellowship
 1980 – Winner Mobil Radio Award for 'Proper Channels' Radio Play (Production)
 1980 – Winner Mobil Radio Award for 'Proper Channels' Radio Play (Writing)
 1976 – Winner of the Māori Writers' Award

References

External links

New Zealand screenwriters
Male screenwriters
New Zealand male television actors
New Zealand male Māori actors
New Zealand male soap opera actors
Māori activists
People from the Hokianga
Toi Whakaari alumni
Green Party of Aotearoa New Zealand politicians
New Zealand actor-politicians
Ngāpuhi people
Companions of the New Zealand Order of Merit
Living people
Unsuccessful candidates in the 2008 New Zealand general election
Year of birth missing (living people)
20th-century New Zealand male actors
21st-century New Zealand male actors
21st-century New Zealand dramatists and playwrights
21st-century New Zealand male writers
New Zealand male dramatists and playwrights
21st-century screenwriters